Johann Carl Friedrich Gauss (30 April 177723 February 1855) was a German mathematician and physicist who made significant contributions to many fields in mathematics and science.

Biography

Early years 
Johann Carl Friedrich Gauss was born on 30 April 1777 in Brunswick (Braunschweig), in the Duchy of Brunswick-Wolfenbüttel (now part of Lower Saxony, Germany), to poor, working-class parents. His mother was illiterate and never recorded the date of his birth, remembering only that he had been born on a Wednesday, eight days before the Feast of the Ascension (which occurs 39 days after Easter). Gauss later solved this puzzle about his birthdate in the context of finding the date of Easter, deriving methods to compute the date in both past and future years. He was christened and confirmed in a church near the school he attended as a child. 

Gauss was a child prodigy. In his memorial on Gauss, Wolfgang Sartorius von Waltershausen wrote that when Gauss was barely three years old he corrected a math error his father made; and that when he was seven, solved an arithmetic series problem faster than anyone else in his class of 100 pupils. There are many versions of this story, with various details regarding the nature of the series – the most frequent being the classical problem of adding together all the integers from 1 to 100. (See also under "Anecdotes" below.) There are many other anecdotes about his precocity while a toddler, and he made his first groundbreaking mathematical discoveries while still a teenager. He completed his magnum opus, Disquisitiones Arithmeticae, in 1798, at the age of 21, and it was published in 1801. This work was fundamental in consolidating number theory as a discipline and has shaped the field to the present day.

Gauss's intellectual abilities attracted the attention of the Duke of Brunswick, who sent him to the Collegium Carolinum (now Braunschweig University of Technology), which he attended from 1792 to 1795, and to the University of Göttingen from 1795 to 1798. While at university, Gauss independently rediscovered several important theorems. His breakthrough occurred in 1796 when he showed that a regular polygon can be constructed by compass and straightedge if the number of its sides is the product of distinct Fermat primes and a power of 2. This was a major discovery in an important field of mathematics; construction problems had occupied mathematicians since the days of the Ancient Greeks, and the discovery ultimately led Gauss to choose mathematics instead of philology as a career.
Gauss was so pleased with this result that he requested that a regular heptadecagon be inscribed on his tombstone. The stonemason declined, stating that the difficult construction would essentially look like a circle.

The year 1796 was productive for both Gauss and number theory. He discovered a construction of the heptadecagon on 30 March. He further advanced modular arithmetic, greatly simplifying manipulations in number theory. On 8 April he became the first to prove the quadratic reciprocity law. This remarkably general law allows mathematicians to determine the solvability of any quadratic equation in modular arithmetic. The prime number theorem, conjectured on 31 May, gives a good understanding of how the prime numbers are distributed among the integers.

Gauss also discovered that every positive integer is representable as a sum of at most three triangular numbers on 10 July and then jotted down in his diary the note: "ΕΥΡΗΚΑ! ". On 1 October he published a result on the number of solutions of polynomials with coefficients in finite fields, which 150 years later led to the Weil conjectures.

In 1807, Gauss became director of the astronomical observatory of the university of Göttingen and was appointed as professor.

Later years and death 
In 1854, Gauss selected the topic for Bernhard Riemann's inaugural lecture "Über die Hypothesen, welche der Geometrie zu Grunde liegen" [On the Hypotheses which lie at the Bases of Geometry]. On the way home from Riemann's lecture, Weber reported that Gauss was full of praise and excitement.

Gauss was member of many scientific societies, among them the Royal Institute of the Netherlands (1845) and the American Philosophical Society (1853).

Gauss remained mentally active into his old age, even while having gout and suffering general unhappiness. At the age of 62, he taught himself Russian. On 23 February 1855, Gauss died of a heart attack in Göttingen (then Kingdom of Hanover and now Lower Saxony); he is interred in the Albani Cemetery there. Two people gave eulogies at his funeral: Gauss's son-in-law Heinrich Ewald, and Wolfgang Sartorius von Waltershausen, who was Gauss's close friend and biographer.

Gauss's brain 
Highly developed convolutions were also found, which in the early 20th century were suggested as the explanation of his genius. After various investigations in the past, a magnetic resonance study of 1998, done at the Max Planck Institute for Biophysical Chemistry in Göttingen. gave no results to explain his mathematical abilities. 

In 2013, a neurobiologist of the same insitute discovered that Gauss's brain had obviously been mixed up, by reason of wrong labelling, with that of the physician Conrad Heinrich Fuchs, who died in Göttingen in the same year as Gauss. A further investigation showed no remarkable anomalities in the brains of both persons. Thus all investigations on Gauss's brain until 1998, except the first ones of Rudolf and Hertmann Wagner, actually refer to the brain of Fuchs.

Religious views 
Gauss was nominally a member of the St. Albans Evangelical Lutheran church in Göttingen. One of his biographers, G. Waldo Dunnington, has described Gauss's religious views as follows:

Apart from his correspondence, there are not many known details about Gauss's personal creed. Many biographers of Gauss disagree about his religious stance, with Bühler and others considering him a deist with very unorthodox views, while Dunnington (admitting that Gauss did not believe literally in all Christian dogmas and that it is unknown what he believed on most doctrinal and confessional questions) points out that he was, at least, a nominal Lutheran.

In connection to this, there is a record of a conversation between Rudolf Wagner and Gauss, in which they discussed William Whewell's book Of the Plurality of Worlds. In this work, Whewell had discarded the possibility of existing life in other planets, on the basis of theological arguments, but this was a position with which both Wagner and Gauss disagreed. Later Wagner explained that he did not fully believe in the Bible, though he confessed that he "envied" those who were able to easily believe. This later led them to discuss the topic of faith, and in some other religious remarks, Gauss said that he had been more influenced by theologians like Lutheran minister Paul Gerhardt than by Moses. Other religious influences included Wilhelm Braubach, Johann Peter Süssmilch, and the New Testament. Two religious works which Gauss read frequently were Braubach's Seelenlehre (Gießen, 1843) and Süssmilch's Göttliche Ordnung, 1756); he also devoted considerable time to the New Testament in the original Greek. 

Dunnington further elaborates on Gauss's religious views by writing: 

Gauss believed in an omniscient source of creation however he claimed that belief or a lack of it did not affect his mathematics.

Though he was not a church-goer, Gauss strongly upheld religious tolerance, believing "that one is not justified in disturbing another's religious belief, in which they find consolation for earthly sorrows in time of trouble." When his son Eugene announced that he wanted to become a Christian missionary, Gauss approved of this, saying that regardless of the problems within religious organizations, missionary work was "a highly honorable" task.

Family 

On 9 October 1805, Gauss married Johanna Osthoff (1780–1809), and had two sons and a daughter with her : Joseph (1806–1873), Wilhelmina (1808–1846) and Louis (1809–1810). Johanna died on 11 October 1809 one month after Louis' birth, who himself died a few months later. Gauss plunged into a depression from which he never fully recovered. He then married Wilhelmine (Minna) Waldeck (1788–1831), a friend of his first wife, on 4 August 1810 and had three more children : Eugen (later Eugene) (1811–1896), Wilhelm (later William) (1813–1879) and Therese (1816–1864). Minna Gauss died on 12 September 1831 after seriously illness for more then a decennium, possibly tuberculosis. Then Therese took over the household and cared for Gauss for the rest of his life. His mother Dorothea Gauss lived in his house from 1817 until her death in 1839.

Gauss was never quite the same without his first wife, and just like his father, grew to dominate his children. Gauss eventually had conflicts with his sons, because he did not want any of them to enter mathematics or science for "fear of lowering the family name", as he believed none of them would surpass his own achievements. Eugen shared a good measure of Gauss's talent in computation and languages, which he wanted to study, whereas Gauss wanted him to become a lawyer. They had an argument over a party Eugen held, for which Gauss refused to pay. The son left in anger and, in about 1832, emigrated to the United States. While working for the American Fur Company in the Midwest, he learned the Sioux language. Later, he moved to Missouri and became a successful businessman. Wilhelm married a niece of the astronomer Bessel and moved also to Missouri in 1837, starting as a farmer and later becoming wealthy in the shoe business in St. Louis. It took many years for Eugene's success to counteract his reputation among Gauss's friends and colleagues. Eugene and William are progenitors of numerous descendents in America, but the German Gauss issue descends from Joseph as the Gauss daughters had no children.

Personality 

Though he did take in a few students, Gauss was known to dislike teaching. Several of his students became influential mathematicians, among them Richard Dedekind and Bernhard Riemann.

On Gauss's recommendation, Friedrich Wilhelm Bessel was awarded an honorary doctoral degree from Göttingen University in March 1811; they had been friends since 1804. Before she died, Sophie Germain was recommended by Gauss to receive an honorary degree; but she never received it. In 1828, Gauss attended the conference of the Society of German Natural Scientists and Physicians in Berlin as special guest of Alexander von Humboldt; by this occasion he got acquainted with Wilhelm Weber. 

Gauss was an ardent perfectionist and a hard worker. He was never a prolific writer, refusing to publish work which he did not consider complete and above criticism. This was in keeping with his personal motto pauca sed matura ("few, but ripe"). His personal diary indicates that he had made several important mathematical discoveries years or decades before his contemporaries published them. Eric Temple Bell said that if Gauss had published all of his discoveries in a timely manner, he would have advanced mathematics by fifty years.
Gauss usually declined to present the intuition behind his often very elegant proofs—he preferred them to appear "out of thin air" and erased all traces of how he discovered them. This is justified, if unsatisfactorily, by Gauss in his Disquisitiones Arithmeticae, where he states that all analysis (in other words, the paths one traveled to reach the solution of a problem) must be suppressed for sake of brevity.

Gauss supported the monarchy and opposed Napoleon, whom he saw as an outgrowth of revolution.

Gauss summarized his views on the pursuit of knowledge in a letter to Farkas Bolyai dated 2 September 1808 as follows:

Career and achievements

Algebra 

In his doctoral thesis from 1799 Gauss proved the fundamental theorem of algebra which states that every non-constant single-variable polynomial with complex coefficients has at least one complex root. Mathematicians including Jean le Rond d'Alembert had produced false proofs before him, and Gauss's dissertation contains a critique of d'Alembert's work. Ironically, by today's standard, Gauss's own attempt is not acceptable, owing to the implicit use of the Jordan curve theorem. However, he subsequently produced three other proofs, the last one in 1849 being generally rigorous. His attempts clarified the concept of complex numbers considerably along the way.

Gauss also made important contributions to number theory with his 1801 book Disquisitiones Arithmeticae, which, among other things, introduced the triple bar symbol  for congruence and used it in a clean presentation of modular arithmetic, contained the first two proofs of the law of quadratic reciprocity, developed the theories of binary and ternary quadratic forms, stated the class number problem for them, and showed that a regular heptadecagon (17-sided polygon) can be constructed with straightedge and compass. It appears that Gauss already knew the class number formula in 1801.

In addition, he proved the following conjectured theorems:
 Fermat polygonal number theorem for n = 3
 Fermat's Last Theorem for n = 5
 Descartes's rule of signs
 Kepler conjecture for regular arrangements

He also
 explained the pentagramma mirificum 
 developed an algorithm for determining the date of Easter
 invented the Cooley–Tukey FFT algorithm for calculating the discrete Fourier transforms 160 years before Cooley and Tukey

Astronomy 

On 1 January 1801, Italian astronomer Giuseppe Piazzi discovered the dwarf planet Ceres. Piazzi could track Ceres for only somewhat more than a month, following it for three degrees across the night sky. Then it disappeared temporarily behind the glare of the Sun. Several months later, when Ceres should have reappeared, Piazzi could not locate it: the mathematical tools of the time were not able to extrapolate a position from such a scant amount of data—three degrees represent less than 1% of the total orbit. Gauss heard about the problem and tackled it. After three months of intense work, he predicted a position for Ceres in December 1801—just about a year after its first sighting—and this turned out to be accurate within a half-degree when it was rediscovered by Franz Xaver von Zach on 31 December at Gotha, and one day later by Heinrich Olbers in Bremen. This confirmation eventually led to the classification of Ceres as minor-planet designation 1 Ceres: the first asteroid (now dwarf planet) ever discovered.

Gauss's method involved determining a conic section in space, given one focus (the Sun) and the conic's intersection with three given lines (lines of sight from the Earth, which is itself moving on an ellipse, to the planet) and given the time it takes the planet to traverse the arcs determined by these lines (from which the lengths of the arcs can be calculated by Kepler's Second Law). This problem leads to an equation of the eighth degree, of which one solution, the Earth's orbit, is known. The solution sought is then separated from the remaining six based on physical conditions. In this work, Gauss used comprehensive approximation methods which he created for that purpose.

One such method was the fast Fourier transform. While this method is attributed to a 1965 paper by James Cooley and John Tukey, Gauss developed it as a trigonometric interpolation method. His paper, Theoria Interpolationis Methodo Nova Tractata, was published only posthumously in Volume 3 of his collected works. This paper predates the first presentation by Joseph Fourier on the subject in 1807.

Zach noted that "without the intelligent work and calculations of Doctor Gauss we might not have found Ceres again". Though Gauss had up to that point been financially supported by his stipend from the Duke, he doubted the security of this arrangement, and also did not believe pure mathematics to be important enough to deserve support. Thus he sought a position in astronomy, and in 1807 was appointed Professor of Astronomy and Director of the astronomical observatory in Göttingen, a post he held for the remainder of his life.

The discovery of Ceres led Gauss to his work on a theory of the motion of planetoids disturbed by large planets, eventually published in 1809 as Theoria motus corporum coelestium in sectionibus conicis solem ambientum (Theory of motion of the celestial bodies moving in conic sections around the Sun). In the process, he so streamlined the cumbersome mathematics of 18th-century orbital prediction that his work remains a cornerstone of astronomical computation. It introduced the Gaussian gravitational constant, and contained an influential treatment of the method of least squares, a procedure used in all sciences to this day to minimize the impact of measurement error.

Gauss proved the method under the assumption of normally distributed errors (see Gauss–Markov theorem; see also Gaussian). The method had been described earlier by Adrien-Marie Legendre in 1805, but Gauss claimed that he had been using it since 1794 or 1795. In the history of statistics, this disagreement is called the "priority dispute over the discovery of the method of least squares."

Geodetic survey 

In 1818 Gauss, putting his calculation skills to practical use, carried out a geodetic survey of the Kingdom of Hanover, linking up with previous Danish surveys. To aid the survey, Gauss invented the heliotrope, an instrument that uses a mirror to reflect sunlight over great distances, to measure positions.

In 1828, when studying differences in latitude, Gauss first defined a physical approximation for the figure of the Earth as the surface everywhere perpendicular to the direction of gravity (of which mean sea level makes up a part), later called the geoid.

Non-Euclidean geometries
Gauss also claimed to have discovered the possibility of non-Euclidean geometries but never published it. This discovery was a major paradigm shift in mathematics, as it freed mathematicians from the mistaken belief that Euclid's axioms were the only way to make geometry consistent and non-contradictory.

Research on these geometries led to, among other things, Einstein's theory of general relativity, which describes the universe as non-Euclidean. His friend Farkas Wolfgang Bolyai with whom Gauss had sworn "brotherhood and the banner of truth" as a student, had tried in vain for many years to prove the parallel postulate from Euclid's other axioms of geometry.

Bolyai's son, János Bolyai, discovered non-Euclidean geometry in 1829; his work was published in 1832. After seeing it, Gauss wrote to Farkas Bolyai: "To praise it would amount to praising myself. For the entire content of the work ... coincides almost exactly with my own meditations which have occupied my mind for the past thirty or thirty-five years." This unproved statement put a strain on his relationship with Bolyai who thought that Gauss was stealing his idea.

Letters from Gauss years before 1829 reveal him obscurely discussing the problem of parallel lines. Waldo Dunnington, a biographer of Gauss, argues in Gauss, Titan of Science (1955) that Gauss was in fact in full possession of non-Euclidean geometry long before it was published by Bolyai, but that he refused to publish any of it because of his fear of controversy.

Theorema Egregium 
The geodetic survey of Hanover, which required Gauss to spend summers traveling on horseback for a decade, fueled Gauss's interest in differential geometry and topology, fields of mathematics dealing with curves and surfaces. Among other things, he came up with the notion of Gaussian curvature.
This led in 1828 to an important theorem, the Theorema Egregium (remarkable theorem), establishing an important property of the notion of curvature. Informally, the theorem says that the curvature of a surface can be determined entirely by measuring angles and distances on the surface.

That is, curvature does not depend on how the surface might be embedded in 3-dimensional space or 2-dimensional space.

In 1821, he was made a foreign member of the Royal Swedish Academy of Sciences. Gauss was elected a Foreign Honorary Member of the American Academy of Arts and Sciences in 1822.

Magnetism 
In 1831, Gauss developed a fruitful collaboration with the physics professor Wilhelm Weber, leading to new knowledge in magnetism (including finding a representation for the unit of magnetism in terms of mass, charge, and time) and the discovery of Kirchhoff's circuit laws in electricity. It was during this time that he formulated his namesake law. They constructed the first electromechanical telegraph in 1833, which connected the observatory with the institute for physics in Göttingen. Gauss ordered a magnetic observatory to be built in the garden of the observatory, and with Weber founded the "Magnetischer Verein" (magnetic association), which supported measurements of Earth's magnetic field in many regions of the world. He developed a method of measuring the horizontal intensity of the magnetic field which was in use well into the second half of the 20th century, and worked out the mathematical theory for separating the inner and outer (magnetospheric) sources of Earth's magnetic field.

Optics 
In 1840, Gauss published his influential Dioptrische Untersuchungen, in which he gave the first systematic analysis on the formation of images under a paraxial approximation (Gaussian optics). Among his results, Gauss showed that under a paraxial approximation an optical system can be characterized by its cardinal points and he derived the Gaussian lens formula.

Appraisal 
The British mathematician Henry John Stephen Smith (1826–1883) gave the following appraisal of Gauss:

Anecdotes 
There are several stories of his early genius. One story has it that in primary school after the young Gauss misbehaved, his teacher, J.G. Büttner, gave him a task: add a list of integers in arithmetic progression; as the story is most often told, these were the numbers from 1 to 100. The young Gauss reputedly produced the correct answer within seconds, to the astonishment of his teacher and his assistant Martin Bartels. Gauss's presumed method was to realize that pairwise addition of terms from opposite ends of the list yielded identical intermediate sums: 1 + 100 = 101, 2 + 99 = 101, 3 + 98 = 101, and so on, for a total sum of 50 × 101 = 5050.
However, the details of the story are at best uncertain (see for discussion of the original Wolfgang Sartorius von Waltershausen source and the changes in other versions), and some authors, such as Joseph J. Rotman in his book A First Course in Abstract Algebra (2005), question whether it ever happened.

He referred to mathematics as "the queen of sciences" and supposedly once espoused a belief in the necessity of immediately understanding Euler's identity as a benchmark pursuant to becoming a first-class mathematician.

Commemorations 

Gauss Monuments were erected in Brunswick and Göttingen (the last together with Weber). busts of Gauss were placed in the Walhalla temple near Regensburg and in the German Research Centre for Geosciences in Potsdam. Several places where Gauss has stayed in Germany are marked with plaques.

From 1989 through 2001, Gauss's portrait, a normal distribution curve and some prominent Göttingen buildings were featured on the front-side of a German ten-mark banknote. The reverse featured the approach for Hanover. Germany has also issued three postage stamps honoring Gauss. One (no. 725) appeared in 1955 on the hundredth anniversary of his death; two others, nos. 1246 and 1811, in 1977, the 200th anniversary of his birth.

The numerous things named in honor of Gauss include:
 the normal distribution, also known as the Gaussian distribution, the most common bell curve in statistics;
 the Gauss Prize, one of the highest honors in mathematics;
 Gaussian units, the most common of the several electromagnetic unit systems based on  CGS units.
 gauss, CGS unit for magnetic field.

In 1929 the Polish mathematician Marian Rejewski, who helped to solve the German Enigma cipher machine in December 1932, began studying actuarial statistics at Göttingen. At the request of his Poznań University professor, Zdzisław Krygowski, on arriving at Göttingen Rejewski laid flowers on Gauss's grave.

Daniel Kehlmann's 2005 novel Die Vermessung der Welt explores Gauss as leading figure through a lens of historical fiction, contrasting him with the German explorer Alexander von Humboldt. A film version directed by Detlev Buck was released in 2012.

On 30 April 2018, Google honored Gauss on his would-be 241st birthday with a Google Doodle showcased in Europe, Russia, Israel, Japan, Taiwan, parts of Southern and Central America and the United States.

The ″Gauss-Gesellschaft Göttingen″ (Gauss Society) was founded in 1964 for resaerches on life and work of Carl Friedrich Gauss and related persons and edits the ″Mitteilungen der Gauss-Gesellschaft″ (Communications of the Gauss Society).

Writings

Mathematics 
 1799:  (Doctoral thesis on the fundamental theorem of algebra, University of Helmstedt) Original book
 1816:  
 1816:  
 1850:  
  (German) 
 1801:  
 
 1808:  (Introduces Gauss's lemma, uses it in the third proof of quadratic reciprocity)
 1809:  
  
 1811:  (Orbit of Pallas)
 1811:  (Determination of the sign of the quadratic Gauss sum, uses this to give the fourth proof of quadratic reciprocity)
 1812:  
 1815: 
 1818:  (Fifth and sixth proofs of quadratic reciprocity)
 1821:  
 1823:  
 1828:  (Three essays concerning the calculation of probabilities as the basis of the Gaussian law of error propagation)
 
 1827: 

 1828: 
 1832:  (Introduces the Gaussian integers, states (without proof) the law of biquadratic reciprocity, proves the supplementary law for 1 + i)
 1845: 
 1847: 
 2005:  (with a historical introduction by Kurt-R. Biermann and acknowledgements by Hans Wussing and Olaf Neumann)

Physics 

 1832: 
 1836: 
 1841: 
 The Intensity of the Earth's Magnetic Force Reduced to Absolute Mesurement. Translated by Susan P. Johnson.
 1840:  
 1843:

together with Wilhelm Weber:

Collected Works

Correspondence 
  (letters from December 1804 to August 1844)
  (letters from February 1802 to  October 1826)
  (letters from September 1797 to February 1853; added letters of other correspondents)
  (letters from June 1810 to June 1854)
  (letters from June 1810 to June 1854)
  (letters from July 1807 to December 1854; added letters of other correspondents)
  (letters from February 1799 to  September 1800)
  (letters from January 1802 to October 1819)
  (letters from January 1820 to May 1839; added letters of other correspondents)
 
 Volumes 1+2 (letters from April 1808 to March 1836)
 Volumes 3+4 (letters from March 1836 to April 1845)
 Volumes 5+6 (letters from April 1845 to November 1850)
  (letters from 1795 to 1815)

The Göttingen Academy of Sciences and Humanities provides a complete collection of the yet known letters from and to Carl Friedrich Gauss that is accessible online.

See also 
 Least squares
 Least-squares spectral analysis
 List of things named after Carl Friedrich Gauss
 Gauss (unit)
 Gaussian distribution
 Gaussian elimination
 Gaussian integer
 Gaussian integral
 Gaussian mixture model
 Gaussian quadrature
 Gaussian curvature

References

Notes

Citation s

Sources 

 
 
 
 

  First edition: 
  With a critical view on Dunnington's style and appraisals

Further reading

External links 

 
 Gauss biography
 Gauss: mathematician of the millennium, by Jürgen Schmidhuber
 Monthly Notices of the Royal Astronomical Society 16 (1856) 80 : Orbituary
 
 "Carl Friedrich Gauss" in the series A Brief History of Mathematics on BBC 4
 
 Carl Friedrich Gauß at the Göttingen University
 Gauss. www.gausschildren.org
 Gauss friends. www.gauss-friends.org/de

 
1777 births
1855 deaths
18th-century German mathematicians
19th-century German mathematicians
Technical University of Braunschweig alumni
Corresponding members of the Saint Petersburg Academy of Sciences
Differential geometers
Fellows of the American Academy of Arts and Sciences
Fellows of the Royal Society
19th-century German astronomers
German Lutherans
19th-century German physicists
Honorary members of the Saint Petersburg Academy of Sciences
Members of the Royal Netherlands Academy of Arts and Sciences
Members of the Royal Swedish Academy of Sciences
Mental calculators
Number theorists
Intuitionism
Linear algebraists
Optical physicists
Scientists from Braunschweig
People from the Duchy of Brunswick
Recipients of the Copley Medal
Recipients of the Pour le Mérite (civil class)
University of Göttingen alumni
Academic staff of the University of Göttingen
University of Helmstedt alumni
Ceres (dwarf planet)
Recipients of the Lalande Prize
Members of the Göttingen Academy of Sciences and Humanities